WJOX-FM (94.5 FM) is a radio station licensed to Birmingham. The station airs a sports radio format.  WJOX is owned by Cumulus Media (the parent of radio network Westwood One). The station was assigned the WJOX-FM call sign by the Federal Communications Commission on February 8, 2010.  The station has studios in Homewood and its transmitter is in West Birmingham along the west ridge of Red Mountain.

Programming
The station is an affiliate of CBS Sports Radio, and was the Birmingham area flagship affiliate for University of Alabama sports. WJOX became the flagship station of the Paul Finebaum Radio Network, which was syndicated throughout Alabama and adjoining states, in 2007.  WJOX is an affiliate of the Tennessee Titans football radio network  and the Atlanta Braves radio network.
In 2013, Finebaum moved to ESPN Radio to host The Paul Finebaum Show for SEC Network, with WJOX continuing to carry the show.

History
The forerunner of WJOX debuted December 1, 1947 as WAFM on 93.3 FM.  At least by 1949, the station was broadcasting on 99.5 FM, where it remained until 1963, when it moved to its current frequency.  It was a sister station to  WAPI; WAFM-TV (now WVTM) was launched in 1949.  WAFM changed its call sign in 1958 to WAPI-FM to match the call letters of its AM sister station.  All three broadcast properties were owned by Advance Publications, the parent company of The Birmingham News.  In the early 1970s, WAPI-FM played "solid gold" music (an early version of the adult contemporary format).  In 1978, the station became an easy listening music station, calling itself "Beautiful 94" (later branded as "FM 94 WAPI, A Pleasure To Be Around"), moving it in competition with WQEZ (now WMJJ).

Federal Communications Commission rules enacted in the late 1970s forced Advance Publications to sell its TV and radio properties in Birmingham. In 1980, WAFM-TV was sold to Times-Mirror Broadcasting, while the radio stations were sold to Dittman Broadcasting, owners of WABB and WABB-FM in Mobile.  In August 1981, 94.5 switched formats, and became Birmingham's second album rock station with the new name "95 Rock".

During the mid-1980s, the Top 40 format, which had disappeared from radio dials in many cities, regained popularity.  Birmingham had one Top 40 station, WKXX (now WBPT).  In 1984, the album rock format was dropped in favor of Top 40, first calling itself "95 FM".  By the end of the year, WAPI-FM was re-launched as "I-95", calling itself "Birmingham's Hit Rock".  Within a year, I-95 had replaced WKXX as the dominant Top 40 station in Birmingham.  The most notable announcers on I-95 were Mark Thompson and Brian Phelps, who first teamed at I-95 before moving to KLOS in Los Angeles in 1987.

I-95 continued to enjoy dominant ratings throughout the remainder of the 1980s, using the slogan "Birmingham’s All-Hit I-95" for the remainder of that decade, and as "The Station in the '90s" into the 1990s.  However, the nationwide decline in popularity of the Top 40 format affected I-95.  In 1994, the station changed call letters to WMXQ ("Mix 94.5") and became a hot adult contemporary music station.  "Mix" was no more successful than I-95 had been in its latter stages, so on September 25, 1996, the station once again changed formats and became a soft adult contemporary station with the new name "Soft Rock 94.5".  The call letters were changed to WYSF in November of the same year.  Television ads for the new station featured actress Teri Garr.

In 1999, the morning drive team of Rick and Bubba moved from crosstown station WQEN to WYSF, where they remained until December 2006, when they departed for country music station WZZK-FM.  In 2001, the station renamed itself "Y-94.5", with no real change in its music.  In reaction to a steep drop in ratings after the departure of Rick and Bubba, the station changed formats at 5:00 p.m. on May 25, 2007. The station dropped its soft adult contemporary format and replaced it with a hot adult contemporary format, changing the on-air name of the station to "The New 94-5 FM".

On July 4, 2008, the station dropped its hot adult contemporary format and began stunting in anticipation of a new format. The station began playing country music at approximately 9:25 p.m. and continued doing so for the next two days.  The station then began simulcasting co-owned sports radio station WJOX as a temporary measure until the format change was completed.

WJOX-FM made 94.5 its permanent home on July 22, 2008, moving from its former dial position of 100.5 FM.  The station began being simulcast on the former WSPZ (690 AM) in February 2010.  Ironically, 690 AM was the original home of the WJOX sports format when the format was introduced to the Birmingham market in 1992.

The WJOX call letters were previously assigned to 106.1 FM in Jackson, Michigan from 1976 to 1981.  This incarnation of WJOX programmed the automated "Stereo Rock" format from TM Programming, using the moniker "Rock 106".  The WJOX call letters were dropped by 106.1 FM on March 11, 1981, when the station adopted its current call letters WJXQ ("Q106").

References

External links
WJOX-FM official website

JOX-FM
Radio stations established in 1947
Sports radio stations in the United States
Cumulus Media radio stations
1947 establishments in Alabama
CBS Sports Radio stations